Herfried Münkler (born August 15, 1951) is a German political scientist. He is a Professor of Political Theory at Humboldt University in Berlin. Münkler is a regular commentator on global affairs in the German-language media and author of numerous books on the history of political ideas (German:  Ideengeschichte), on state-building and on the theory of war, such as "Machiavelli" (1982), "Gewalt und Ordnung" (1992), "The New Wars" (orig. 2002) and "Empires: The Logic of World Domination from Ancient Rome to the United States" (orig. 2005). In 2009 Münkler was awarded the Leipzig Book Fair Prize in the category "Non-fiction" for Die Deutschen und ihre Mythen (engl. "the Germans and their myths").

Early life and education
Münkler grew up in rural south Hesse in the early years of post-war West Germany. In 1970, he graduated (Abitur) from the Augustinerschule in Friedberg.

Münkler studied German, political science and philosophy at the Goethe University Frankfurt in Frankfurt am Main, graduating with the first Staatsexamen in 1977 and earning a PhD with a dissertation titled „Geschichtsphilosophie und politisches Handeln. Niccolò Machiavellis Antworten auf den Zusammenbruch der christlichen Geschichtsphilosophie und die Krise der Republik Florenz“ (translation: "Philosophy of history and political action. Machiavelli's answers to the collapse of Christian philosophy of history and the crisis of the Republic of Florence) in 1981.

Career
From 1982 Münkler was a research assistant at the department of social sciences at Goethe University. He habilitated at Frankfurt 1987 with a thesis on the topic „Staatsraison. Ein Leitbegriff der Frühen Neuzeit“ (translation: National interest. A Leitmotif in the Early Modern Age) and became professor for political science there.

In March 1992, Münkler was offered a professorship at Humboldt University Berlin, which he took up. Since then, he has been a professor for Political Theory there.

Other activities
 Berlin-Brandenburg Academy of Sciences and Humanities, Member
 Federal Academy for Security Policy (BAKS), Member of the Advisory Board (since 2015)
 Jugend debattiert, Member of the Board of Trustees

Political views 
During his time as a student, Münkler was a member of the Jusos (youth organisation of the Social Democratic Party of Germany). In July 2011, he published an essay in the German weekly news magazine Der Spiegel calling for more centralisation of power in the European Union.

Personal life
Münkler and his wife, Marina, were married in 1983. She is a professor of German literature and German studies at Dresden University. They have two children. Their daughter Laura Münkler is a law professor at Greifswald University.

Selected works 
in English:
 Empires: The Logic of World Domination from Ancient Rome to the United States, Polity, Malden, Massachusetts, 2001
 New Wars, Polity, Malden, Massachusetts, 2005
in German:
 Konzeptionen der Gerechtigkeit: Kulturvergleich – Ideengeschichte – moderne Debatte, Nomos, Baden-Baden 1999 (ed.).
 Lexikon der Renaissance, Beck, München 2000 (with Marina Münkler).
 Thomas Hobbes, Campus-Verlag, Frankfurt/Main, New York 2001.
 Der demokratische Nationalstaat in den Zeiten der Globalisierung: politische Leitideen für das 21. Jahrhundert, Akademie-Verlag, Berlin 2002 (ed.).
 Über den Krieg: Stationen der Kriegsgeschichte im Spiegel ihrer theoretischen Reflexion, Velbrück, Weilerswist 2003.
 Politikwissenschaft: ein Grundkurs, Rowohlt Taschenbuch-Verlag, Reinbek bei Hamburg 2003 (ed.).
 Clausewitz' Theorie des Krieges, Nomos, Baden-Baden 2003.
 Der neue Golfkrieg, Rowohlt, Reinbek bei Hamburg 2003.
 Machiavelli: die Begründung des politischen Denkens der Neuzeit aus der Krise der Republik Florenz, Fischer Taschenbuch-Verlag, Frankfurt am Main 2004 (zugleich: Dissertation, Frankfurt (Main) 1981).
 Die neuen Kriege, 2002 (=The New Wars, Polity Press 2004).
 Imperien. Die Logik der Weltherrschaft. Vom alten Rom bis zu den Vereinigten Staaten, 2005 (= Empires: The Logic of World Domination from Ancient Rome to the US, 2007).
 Die Deutschen und ihre Mythen, 2008
 Mitte und Maß. Der Kampf um die richtige Ordnung., 2010
 Der Große Krieg: Die Welt 1914 bis 1918, 2013
 Macht in der Mitte: Die neuen Aufgaben Deutschlands in Europa, 2015
 Der Dreißigjährige Krieg: Europäische Katastrophe, deutsches Trauma 1618-1648, 2017
 Marx, Wagner, Nietzsche: Welt im Umbruch, 2021

Film and TV appearances 

 Marx Reloaded, Arte, April 2011.

References

Further reading 
 Wolfgang Röhr (Hrsg.): Herfried Münklers Herausforderung an die hegemonische Denkweise des Politischen: Kann man einen in Deutschland blockierten Diskurs über die republikanische Einbettung des Demokratischen aufbrechen?, Ad Fontes, Hamburg 2001.
 Ismail Küpeli: Die neuen Kriege - Einige Anmerkungen zu Kriegslegitimationen des 21. Jahrhunderts, in: ibd.: Europas "Neue Kriege", Moers, 2007,  (free download)

External links 

HU faculty profile

Living people
1951 births
German political scientists
21st-century German historians
Historians of World War I
Historians of Germany
German historians of philosophy
People from Friedberg, Hesse